Portland Mason (26 November 1948 – 10 May 2004) was an American child actress and writer.

Early life 
Mason was born on 26 November 1948 and was the elder child of English actors James Mason and Pamela Mason. She was named after Portland Hoffa, the wife of James Mason's friend Fred Allen.

She enjoyed a luxurious upbringing in her parents' Hollywood mansion, allowed to wear makeup, stiletto heels and owning her own mink coat and diamonds by the age of nine. Her highly publicized life began with her father becoming violent towards a photographer at the little girl's christening. When she attended high school, Mason was dropped off every morning by a Rolls-Royce and picked up every evening by a white Cadillac. Her father introduced her to smoking at the age of three in hope it would put her off it in later life. The family sometimes claimed reports of her extravagant childhood were exaggerated, and a London reporter who interviewed her in 1966 found her "surprisingly , somewhat shy and unassuming".

Career 
Mason began her acting career young, appearing on many television shows and by the age of four had starred in her own short entitled The Child. Mason then went on to play the daughter of Gregory Peck's character in the 1956 film The Man in the Gray Flannel Suit. After that, she appeared in many films, shows and television series. As a 13-year-old in 1962, she had a contract dispute with Lyl Productions. She had been cast in the role of "Marnie" for The New Loretta Young Show but was dismissed over leaving the studio lot for lunch and missing the start of rehearsals. The Mason family and Lyl Productions sued each other for breach of contract, with both the trial and subsequent appeal finding in favour of the Mason family.

Her most notable role was Georgina in The Great St Trinian's Train Robbery in 1966. Following her final film role in 1968's Sebastian, she took up her mother's profession as a writer. According to her husband, she had been writing a book about her father before her death.

Personal life
In 1971, James Mason married his second wife, Clarissa Kaye. After he died in 1984, Mason and her brother ended up in a protracted legal battle with their stepmother over their father's will and his cremated remains. In 1999, they obtained their father's ashes. She had a debilitating stroke shortly after her father's ashes were spread in Vevey, Switzerland in November 2000.

Death
After a long illness, Mason died on 10 May 2004, survived by her husband Rob Schuyler.

Filmography

References

External links

1948 births
2004 deaths
20th-century American actresses
American people of English descent
20th-century American women
James Mason family
21st-century American women